James Joseph Damman (January 16, 1933 – February 23, 2011) was an American, Republican politician from Michigan.

Born in Grosse Pointe Park, Michigan, Damman served in the United States Army. He then served on the Troy, Michigan city commission and in the Michigan House of Representatives for two terms, and then the 57th lieutenant governor of Michigan 1975–1979 under Governor William Milliken. He also worked for his father's business, the Damman Hardware chain. Damman worked in real estate and then founded QuantumDigital Incorporated, a technology company in Austin, Texas. He died in Austin, Texas.

Notes

External links
James Joseph Damman memorial at Find a Grave

1933 births
2011 deaths
People from Grosse Pointe Park, Michigan
People from Austin, Texas
Businesspeople from Michigan
Businesspeople from Texas
Michigan city council members
Republican Party members of the Michigan House of Representatives
Lieutenant Governors of Michigan
20th-century American politicians
20th-century American businesspeople